Dab Amir (also Romanized as Dab Āmīr; also known as Dab ol Amīr and Dūb ol Mīr) is a village in Jarahi Rural District, in the Central District of Mahshahr County, Khuzestan Province, Iran. At the 2006 census, its population was 29, in 5 families.

References 

Populated places in Mahshahr County